China Foreign Economy and Trade Trust Co., Ltd. known as FOTIC is a Chinese asset management company (as trust company). The company is a wholly owned subsidiary of Sinochem Group (via Sinochem Corporation for 93.07% and another subsidiary for 6.93%).

History
FOTIC was incorporated on 30 September 1987 (as ). Since 1994, FOTIC was a subsidiary of Sinochem Group (formerly known as China National Chemicals Import & Export Corporation). Some assets and liabilities were transferred to Exim Bank of China that year.

Equity investments
In 2004 the company was one of the investor of the Pacific Securities (a listed company since 2007 as ) for 22.56% stake. In 2007 it was diluted to 10.00%. At the same time, FOTIC also signed a shareholders' agreement with 5 companies, making the consortium acted as the largest shareholder of the Pacific Securities. The agreement expired in March 2010, which FOTIC withdrew from the renewed agreement. In June 2011 to March 12 FOTIC sold 5.02% shares of the Pacific Securities, which the shares were no longer restricted to sell due to 2007 IPO (a 36 months restriction), making FOTIC owned below 5% shares, the threshold to regularly disclose its interests. It was further decreased to 4.58% on 31 March, 2.39% on 30 June to below 2% on 30 September (the 10th largest shareholder owned 2.08% and the shares held by FOTIC was not included in the top 10).

The company also owned 49% stake of Manulife-Sinochem Life Insurance until January 2012. The stake were transferred to another subsidiary of Sinochem Group.

References

External links
  

Financial services companies of China
Investment management companies of China
Chinese companies established in 1987
Government-owned companies of China
Companies based in Beijing